Abre las Ventanas al Amor (English: Open the Windows to Love) is a song performed by Brazilian singer-songwriter Roberto Carlos and included on his studio album Sonríe (1989). It was written and produced by Argentinean singer-songwriter Roberto Livi and co-produced by Mauro Motta and released in 1990 as the second single from the album. The song became Carlos' second number-one hit in the Billboard Top Latin Songs chart after "Si El Amor Se Va" (1988) and his seventh top ten single in the chart.

References

1990 singles
1989 songs
Roberto Carlos (singer) songs
Spanish-language songs
CBS Discos singles
Songs written by Roberto Livi
1980s ballads
Latin ballads
Pop ballads